Louie Bickerton and Meryl O'Hara Wood defeated the first seeds Esna Boyd and Sylvia Harper 6–3, 6–3 in the final, to win the women's doubles tennis title at the 1927 Australian Championships.

Seeds

  Esna Boyd /  Sylvia Harper (final)
  Louie Bickerton /  Meryl O'Hara Wood  (champions)
  Mavis McKay /  Gladys Toyne (quarterfinals)
  Kathleen Le Messurier /  Dorothy Weston (semifinals)

Draw

Draw

Notes

 Original pairing was Bickerton with Daphne Akhurst, but the latter had to withdraw owing to illness.
 Probably Mrs. W. T. Rowe (Flora Rowe).

References

External links
Source for seedings

1927 in Australian tennis
1927 in women's tennis
1927 in Australian women's sport
Women's Doubles